The Heebee-jeebees are a Canadian a cappella quartet formed in 1993 in Calgary, Alberta, Canada.  The Heebee-jeebees have released 9 recordings, all to international recognition including 4  CARA nominations and 2 CARA Awards.  They have won the Canadian A Cappella Northern Harmony Championships twice, and have been named the inaugural inductee into the Northern Harmony Hall of Fame. The group often incorporates comedy and audience interaction into their performances.

Currently the band's lineup is Jonathan Love (tenor), Chris Herard (tenor), Ken Lima-Coelho (tenor), and Cédric Blary (bass).

Discography
Albums are all independent releases on the Heebee-jeebees' own label "Guy Records".

 Hurry Up and Wait (1995)
 Waiting Under the Mistletoe (1997)
 Heebee-jeebee TV (2000)
 FALALALALA! (2001)
 Xmas Nuts (2004)
 Surgical Strike (2006)
 Christmas Crackers (2007)
 Swamp Mix! (2010)

Awards 
2008 First a Group inaugurated into the Canadian A Cappella Hall of Fame
 2004 - Pacific Northwest Regional Champions
 1998 - First Place and Audience favourite at the Pacific North West Harmony Sweeps, becoming the first Canadian group to advance to the Sweeps finals.
 2001 - First Place and Audience Favourite at Northern Harmony Canadian A Cappella Festival.
 1999 - Second Place and Audience Favourite at Northern Harmony Canadian A Cappella Festival, and Best Original Song for "Use The Force".
 1997 - First Place and Audience Favourite at Northern Harmony Canadian A Cappella Festival.

See also
The Heebee-jeebees' Official website
Northern Harmony - The Canadian A Cappella Festival - Hall of Fame - The Heebee-jeebees were the inaugural inductee.

A cappella musical groups
Canadian comedy musical groups
Musical groups established in 1993
Musical groups from Calgary
1993 establishments in Alberta